Emine Ayna, (1 July 1968, Dicle, Diyarbakir, Turkey) is Turkish Kurd politician She was a member of the former Democratic Society Party (DTP). She joined the Peace and Democracy Party (BDP), after the Constitutional Court banned DTP on 11 December 2009.

Life and career
Emine Ayna was born in Dicle in 1968, to mother Günay and father Osman. She is a niece of Ömer Ayna, one of ten victims of the Kızıldere Operation (30 March 1972). She is a high school graduate and founder of the Rainbow Women's Association. In 2007, she stood as an independent candidate within the Thousand Hopes alliance in the Turkish parliamentary elections, receiving 15.57% of the vote in Mardin and entering the Turkish Parliament.

On 20 July 2008, she was elected to the DTP leadership, sharing this position with Ahmet Türk. She also became Chair of the DTP Parliamentary Group, when Ahmet Türk resigned. She is widely viewed as a hardliner in demanding Kurdish cultural and political rights.

In June 2011 she was sentenced to 10 months imprisonment, for making terrorist propaganda for a speech she held at a Newroz celebration in Siirt in 2007. It was stated that at the celebration she wore clothes featuring symbols of an illegal organization and that there were shown posters with the leaders of an illegal organization.

In 2009, she stated that she could not speak Kurdish.

External links 
 Interview with Emine Ayna, June 2009

References

1968 births
Turkish Kurdish politicians
Living people
Deputies of Mardin
Democratic Society Party politicians
Democratic Regions Party politicians
Deputies of Diyarbakır
Members of the 24th Parliament of Turkey
Members of the 23rd Parliament of Turkey
21st-century Turkish women politicians
21st-century Turkish politicians